ㅙ is one of the Korean hangul. The Unicode for ㅙ is U+3159. This compound vowel is ㅗ + ㅐ. To pronounce this vowel, shape your mouth to make the ㅗ sound. Then start to say the ㅗ sound and while quickly saying the ㅐ sound. The resulting sound is ㅙ (wae) as in ‘wedding’.

References

Hangul jamo
Vowel letters